Hassan Bayadi is an Iranian conservative politician who was formerly a member and Vice Chairman of City Council of Tehran.

References 

1956 births
Living people
Alliance of Builders of Islamic Iran politicians
Resistance Front of Islamic Iran politicians
Voice of Nation politicians
Vice Chairmen of City Council of Tehran
People from Ray, Iran
Tehran Councillors 2007–2013
Tehran Councillors 2003–2007